The Diligencia Formation (Td) is a geologic formation cropping out in the Orocopia Mountains in southern California. It preserves mammal fossils dating to the Late Oligocene to Early Miocene (Arikareean in the NALMA classification).

Description 
The non-marine Diligencia Formation, defined by Crowell in 1975, is composed of alluvial, fluvial, and lacustrine conglomerates, sandstones, siltstones and limestones. It contains interbedded basalt and andesite flows, dated by whole-rock and plagioclase K-Ar methods as ca. 24–21 Ma), and andesitic sills and dikes.

Fossil content 
The formation has provided the following fossils:
Mammals
 Artiodactyls
 Merycoidodontidae
 Merychyus cf. minimus

See also 

 List of fossiliferous stratigraphic units in California
 Paleontology in California
 Plush Ranch Formation
 Tick Canyon Formation

References

Bibliography 
 
 

Geologic formations of California
Miocene Series of North America
Oligocene Series of North America
Miocene California
Paleogene California
Chattian Stage
Aquitanian (stage)
Sandstone formations of the United States
Conglomerate formations
Shale formations of the United States
Siltstone formations
Oligocene volcanism
Alluvial deposits
Fluvial deposits
Lacustrine deposits
Paleontology in California